Lidia Tomashevskaya (formerly Tomnikova) (born May 27, 1995) is a Russian chess player who was awarded the title Woman International Master in 2014.

Tomnikova won the 2013 U-18 Girls' World Youth Chess Championship.

References

External links

World Youth Chess Champions
Living people
1995 births
Place of birth missing (living people)
Russian female chess players
Chess Woman International Masters